Copromyxa is a genus of Amoebozoa in the eukaryotic supergroup Amoebozoa. It currently includes 2 species, the sorocarpic (aggregatively fruiting) amoeba Copromyxa protea and the non-sorocarpic amoeba Copromyxa (=Hartmannella) cantabrigiensis. There is also a species Copromyxa arborescens, which is a synonym of C. protea.

References

Amoebozoa genera